A jukung or kano, also known as cadik is a small wooden Indonesian outrigger canoe. It is a traditional fishing boat, but newer uses include "Jukung Dives", using the boat as a vehicle for small groups of SCUBA divers.

The double outrigger jukung is but one of many types of Austronesian outrigger canoes that use the crab claw sail traditional throughout Polynesia. Whilst this sail presents some difficulties in tacking into the wind, actually requiring to jibe around, a jukung is superb in its reaching ability and jibe-safe running. They are usually highly decorated and bear a marlin-like prow.

People in Kalimantan also named their boat Jukung. It is used for transport in daily activities such as going to the office, to school, or shopping in pasar terapung (The Floating Market, a very famous tourist attraction).

Currently there is a modern version of jukung made from High Density Polyethylene (HDPE) pipe in Indonesia. Advertised as unsinkable, the main body is made of a closed HDPE pipe that contains sealed air as the source of its buoyancy.

Type of jukung 

 Jukung gede (in Balinese language gede means large). A large type of jukung used for transporting 4-5 cows from Bali to Nusa Penida in Lombok strait, often seen in Kusamba beach.
 Jukung payangan. This is the big and famous fish catcher from salompeng. The hull is about 15 m long with 5 crewmen. Payang itself refers to a type of seine used by local fishermen.
 Jukung polangan. The usual type of jukung at Sepulu, with projecting rear end, boom-spar and five seats (called polangan). The front and back "fins" were carved and painted with gold. The hull is using Madurese jukung style.

The great Jukung race

Crews were from New Zealand, Australia, USA, England, Japan, France, Germany, The Netherlands and Indonesia. This was a three-month expedition masterminded by Bob Hobmann, filmed and made into a documentary called "Passage out of Paradise"; it was featured by the National Geographic Society as "The Great Jukung Race". It was the first ever expedition of this kind, following purported Austronesian sailing routes in craft dating 7,000 years old.

The expedition started in Bali, where once crews were familiar with sailing their Jukungs they embarked on a two-month adventure following the ancient sailing routes used around 1,000 years BC, along the eastern Islands via Komodo Island. They completed the journey with a treacherous 5 day sail across the Arafura Sea to Darwin, via the Tiwi Islands.

Challenges experienced were storms requiring numerous boat repairs, waterspouts, excessive exposure to sun, heat, or rain, adverse currents & whirlpools. Hazards included drifting onto war-torn Timor, unpredictable behaviour/welcome from remote villagers, salt water boils, wound infections, malnutrition, near misses with night-time freighters, sightings of sperm whales and giant white sharks. Some sailors were viciously attacked by hornets while preparing to leave a remote beach camp. The crews rebelled & unanimously decided to sail as a group, as opposed to racing the final leg of the journey, for safety.

The fleet of 9 jukungs and 18 international sailors were given a traditional welcome by local Melville Island Aborigines, and successfully reached their final destination of Darwin, Australia.

See also 
Vinta, a similar outrigger boat from the Philippines
Mayang, another Indonesian fishing boat
Kakap
 Lancaran
 Penjajap
 Kelulus
 Jong
Jukung tambangan

References

External links
 Traditional Boats by Horst Liebner 
 Horridge, Adrian (2015). Perahu Layar Tradisional Nusantara. Yogyakarta: Penerbit Ombak. An Indonesian translation of Horridge, Adrian (1985). The Prahu: Traditional Sailing Boat of Indonesia, second edition. Oxford: Oxford University Press.
A Jukung from Madura Island – Traditional Indonesian Trimaran
http://www.aquatec.co.id

Types of fishing vessels
Sailing ships
Boats of Indonesia
Outrigger canoes
Indigenous boats